Grintovec pri Osilnici is a small settlement on the left bank of the Kolpa River in the Municipality of Osilnica in southern Slovenia. The area is part of the traditional region of Lower Carniola and is now included in the Southeast Slovenia Statistical Region.

Name
The name of the settlement was changed from Grintovec to Grintovec pri Osilnici in 1953. In the past the German name was Grintouz.

References

External links
Grintovec pri Osilnici on Geopedia

Populated places in the Municipality of Osilnica